Jonathan Clay "JJ" Redick (born June 24, 1984) is an American former professional basketball player who is a podcaster and sports analyst for ESPN. He was selected 11th overall by the Orlando Magic in the 2006 NBA draft. He played college basketball for the Duke Blue Devils.

In college, Redick was known for his excellent three-point and free-throw shooting. He set ACC records during his career for most points and most career ACC tournament points at the time. Redick is the all-time leading scorer for Duke. He also set several other Duke records, including most points in a single season.

After being drafted by the Magic, he played for seven seasons in Orlando, followed by a short spell with the Milwaukee Bucks, then four seasons with the Los Angeles Clippers. In 2017, he signed a one-year contract with the Philadelphia 76ers, and re-signed with them on a one-year deal the following year. In 2019, Redick signed a two-year deal with the New Orleans Pelicans. He was traded to the Dallas Mavericks in 2021. After 15 seasons in the NBA, Redick retired on September 21, 2021.

Redick became the first NBA player and the second active professional athlete to take on a podcast during the regular season. It was started in 2016 at Yahoo! Sports. He moved his podcast to media company Uninterrupted, then continued his podcast episodes on The Ringer in 2017. In 2020 he left The Ringer to start his own YouTube channel, and he co-founded the media company ThreeFourTwo Productions. He occasionally appears on First Take.

High school career
Redick was a McDonald's All-American at Cave Spring High School in Roanoke, Virginia, winning the 2002 McDonald's All-American Game MVP. He scored 43 points as a senior in the Virginia High School League (VHSL) Class AAA state championship game, a game in which the Knights defeated George Wythe High School of Richmond. Redick's total was a VHSL championship-game record for all classes, standing until  Mac McClung scored 47 for Gate City High School in the 2018 Class 2A final. Redick played Amateur Athletic Union (AAU) basketball with the Boo Williams team, playing against Dwyane Wade in a July 1999 tournament in Orlando.

Considered a five-star recruit by Scout.com, Redick was highly recruited and listed as the No. 2 shooting guard and the No. 13 player in the nation in 2002.

College career
In his first year at Duke University, Redick led his team with 30 points in their victory over NC State in the ACC Tournament championship game. He put up 26 points against Central Michigan in the second round of the NCAA tournament. However, he struggled in Duke's Sweet Sixteen loss to Kansas, hitting only two of 16 shots.

Redick served as co-captain in his junior year, along with senior point guard Daniel Ewing. He also served as captain his senior year, along with fellow seniors Shelden Williams, Sean Dockery and Lee Melchionni.

In the 2004–05 season, Redick led Duke in scoring with 21.8 points per game. He won the ACC Player of the Year award, and the Adolph F. Rupp Trophy for national player of the year. Redick's victory in the Rupp voting spoiled the consensus for Utah's Andrew Bogut, who won every other major player of the year award. In 2006, after facing close competition all year from Gonzaga's Adam Morrison, Redick won the major player of the year awards.

Redick set a record for the most consecutive free throws made in the ACC with 54. This record began on March 20, 2003, and ended on January 15, 2004. It was broken on January 22, 2012, by Scott Wood from NC State. Redick entered his final postseason with a chance to go down as the NCAA's all-time leading free-throw shooter. The record, 91.3%, was held at the time by Gary Buchanan of Villanova. In an otherwise triumphant visit to Greensboro Coliseum for the 2006 ACC tournament and early NCAA tournament games, Redick struggled at the line, lowering his career free-throw percentage by about 0.5% and finishing his career with 91.16% (660 out of 724).

On February 14, 2006, in the first half of a game against Wake Forest, Redick broke Virginia alumnus Curtis Staples's NCAA record of 413 career three-pointers made. Keydren Clark of Saint Peter's College subsequently surpassed Redick's mark in the MAAC tournament. However, Redick returned the favor by hitting 15 three-pointers in the ACC Tournament and 12 in the NCAA Tournament to finish ahead of Clark. Redick finished his career with an NCAA-record 457 three-point field goals shooting 40.4% from three-point range. His career three-pointers record was broken on February 2, 2014, by Oakland University's Travis Bader.

In the game after breaking Staples' record, Redick scored 30 points on February 19, 2006, against Miami to become the all-time leading scorer at Duke, with 2,557 points scored in his career. On February 25, in a game versus Temple, Redick passed Dickie Hemric's 51-year-old ACC scoring record of 2,587 points with a pair of free throws in the waning minutes of the game. His record was topped in one of the opening round games of the 2009 NCAA tournament by North Carolina's Tyler Hansbrough. Redick finished his career with 2,769 points.

On March 10, 2006, in an ACC Tournament quarterfinal against Miami, Redick scored 25 points, setting a Duke record for points in a season with 858. Redick ended the season with 964 points. Redick came up just short of the ACC record for points scored in a season, which was set by Dennis Scott with 970 points in 1990. Redick also finished his career as the leading scorer in ACC tournament history. His total of 225 points eclipsed Wake Forest's Len Chappell, who scored 220 points in the tournament from 1960 to 1962.

As the marquee player of the Blue Devils, Redick was the target of abuse by fans of rival teams. Clay Travis, of CBS Sports, called him the "most hated current athlete in America." After students from rivals Maryland and North Carolina discovered his cell phone number, Redick estimated that he received 50 to 75 hate calls per day from opposing fans. He was often the target of obscenity-laced tirades from fans. Redick was so often a target from rival fans that even his family members were harassed. Opposing crowds went as far as telling him during the game that "they had sex with his little sister" and that "your little brother is gay". Comments that crowds antagonized Redick with involving his underage siblings weren't dealt with. JJ almost quit basketball his sophomore year because of how much hate he received for no specific reason from so many people.

He had 36 double-figure scoring games in a single season, tied as of March 28, 2010, for 5th-most in Duke history with Jon Scheyer, Shane Battier, and Jason Williams.

J.J. Redick was chosen as a cover athlete and official spokesman for College Hoops 2K7. The game was released on Xbox, Xbox 360
& PlayStation 2 at 2006 and PlayStation 3 at 2007.

On February 4, 2007, Redick's no. 4 jersey was retired at Cameron Indoor Stadium at a special halftime ceremony. Redick became the 13th Duke player to have his jersey retired.

Professional career

Orlando Magic (2006–2013)
Redick was selected with the 11th pick in the 2006 NBA draft by the Orlando Magic. Pre-draft scouting reports praised Redick's perimeter shooting and basketball intelligence, but questioned his defensive ability and speculated that he might not be tall or athletic enough to create his own shots in the NBA. This scouting report was highlighted when Duke played LSU in the 2006 NCAA tournament. LSU's Garrett Temple, a 6'5" guard known for his athleticism and a large wingspan, chased Redick throughout the game. Taken out of his normal rhythm, Redick—the number two scorer in the nation at the time—had one of the worst shooting performances of his college career, shooting 3-for-18 from the field and scoring 11 points in a Duke loss.

In a 2005 interview with the Charlotte Observer, Redick said, "I think I'll be a role player like 80 percent of the players in the league are. I don't expect to be a star, I'll just shoot, be a team player." He moved up into the backup shooting guard position behind well-known veteran and Duke alum Grant Hill.

Redick competed against Trevor Ariza and Keith Bogans for the starting shooting guard spot in 2007–08. He was pulled from playing more than once for his lack of defense during the preseason. He came into the season as a third-string player and saw limited action due to back spasms, but moved into limited rotation after Ariza was traded to the Los Angeles Lakers early in the season. In January 2008, Redick posted on his personal blog that "it's been proven that even if I play well in the limited minutes I get that not much is going to change." On January 31, 2008, the Orlando Sentinel reported that Redick had asked his agent, Arn Tellem, to inquire about a possible trade. "We want to see what's out there," Redick said. "I want to stay here, but it's been frustrating." Magic coach Stan Van Gundy responded: "Right now it would be very hard to fit him in. I know it's also hard to keep sitting him on the bench... Should we be playing him? Right now we're going good so we probably won't disrupt things." The Orlando Magic confirmed Van Gundy's comments by stating that Redick would not receive more minutes or a trade before the February 21, 2008 trade deadline.

In the 2008–09 season, Redick averaged 17.4 minutes per game instead of the previous season's 8.1; he played in 64 games instead of the previous season's 34. He averaged six points per game. The Magic made it to the NBA Finals, but lost to the Lakers in five games. Redick started all seven games in the Eastern Conference Semi-finals in place of regular starter Courtney Lee.

On March 28, 2010, Redick set career highs in rebounds (7), assists (8) and minutes played (46). Vince Carter was injured just 95 seconds into the game; backup swingman Mickael Pietrus was also injured, leaving Redick to play the entire game.

On July 9, 2010, the Chicago Bulls signed Redick to a three-year, $19 million offer sheet. The Magic matched this offer on July 16, 2010, retaining the rights to Redick. On April 25, 2012, Redick achieved a career high with the Magic, scoring 31 points against the Charlotte Bobcats.

Milwaukee Bucks (2013)
On February 21, 2013, Redick was traded from the Magic to the Milwaukee Bucks along with guard Ish Smith and forward Gustavo Ayon for guard Beno Udrih, guard Doron Lamb, and forward Tobias Harris. Redick had difficulties in Milwaukee and his performance suffered.

Los Angeles Clippers (2013–2017)
On July 10, 2013, Redick was acquired by the Los Angeles Clippers via a three-team sign-and-trade deal that also involved the Bucks and the Phoenix Suns. Redick reportedly signed a four-year, $27 million contract. Redick started 218 of the first 219 games he played for the Clippers, becoming a "full-fledged starter" in the NBA. On January 15, 2014, Redick scored a then career-high 33 points in a 129–127 win over the Dallas Mavericks.

On January 18, 2016, Redick scored a career-high 40 points in a 140–132 overtime win over the Houston Rockets. He connected on his first five attempts behind the arc and finished 9-of-12 on three-pointers, tying Caron Butler's franchise record for three-pointers made in a game. He later competed in the Three-Point Contest during the 2016 NBA All-Star weekend.

On November 5, 2016, Redick increased his streak of consecutive games with a made three-pointer to 62, in a 116–92 win over the San Antonio Spurs. He also completed a four-point play against the Spurs, the 26th of his career. On April 12, 2017, Redick made three 3-pointers against Sacramento in the regular-season finale to finish with 201, breaking his career high and single-season franchise record of 200. The Clippers went on to lose in the first round of the NBA playoffs in seven games to the Utah Jazz.

Philadelphia 76ers (2017–2019)
On July 8, 2017, Redick signed a one-year, $23 million contract with the Philadelphia 76ers. On November 3, 2017, Redick scored 31 points on 11-of-19 shooting with 8-of-12 from 3-point range in a 121–110 win over the Indiana Pacers. On November 25, 2017, he hit eight 3-pointers and scored 29 points in a 130–111 win over the Orlando Magic. Redick missed seven games in January 2018 with a leg injury.

On July 6, 2018, Redick re-signed with the 76ers. Redick was moved to the bench for the start of the 2018–19 season and on October 20, he had his best game since moving to the bench, scoring 31 points on 10-of-20 shooting, including eight 3-pointers, in a 116–115 win over the Magic. On December 19, in a 131–109 win over the New York Knicks, Redick scored his 10,000th career point. On February 8, he scored a season-high 34 points in a 117–110 win over the Denver Nuggets. On March 19, he was two assists shy of his first NBA triple-double in 761 career games, finishing with 27 points, 10 rebounds and eight assists in a 118–114 win over the Charlotte Hornets. In April 2019, Redick set the franchise record for most 3-pointers in a season, surpassing Kyle Korver's mark of 226 set in 2004–05.

New Orleans Pelicans (2019–2021)
On July 15, 2019, Redick signed with the New Orleans Pelicans. After finishing the pandemic-shortened season with a record of 30–42, the Pelicans missed the playoffs, marking the first time in Redick's career that he missed the playoffs.
He was reunited with his former Magic head coach Van Gundy in his second season in New Orleans. It was around this time that he had decided to leave The Ringer that he's been in since 2017 and start all over with a YouTube channel in 2020, putting content out every week going forward.

Dallas Mavericks (2021)
Redick was traded to the Dallas Mavericks on March 26, 2021. He made his debut to the Mavs on April 12.

Retirement
On September 21, 2021, Redick announced his retirement from basketball and stated that "All good things must come to an end. It's a cliche that's used often but rarely does it hold its true meaning. This, however, is not one of those instances."

Off the court

Podcasting 
In January 2016, Redick launched a podcast on Yahoo! Sports. He was the first active NBA player and the second active professional athlete to host a podcast. Redick said that he did not get any pushback from the organizations about doing the podcast and attributed that to focusing on getting the basketball work done first.

He began in 2016 at Yahoo! Sports. In July 2017, he moved his podcast to Uninterrupted, a media company. After meeting producer and writer Tommy Alter, Redick decided to continue his podcast on The Ringer in 2017. Redick hosted three seasons on the Ringer: two as a solo host, and the third with Alter as co-host.

In 2020, he left The Ringer to own his content and start his own media company, co-founding ThreeFourTwo Productions with Alter, a reference to the 342 shots he would take every Sunday during the off-season. He currently hosts "The Old Man and the Three" along with Alter. The podcast premiered August 5, 2020 inside the NBA bubble in Orlando, Florida with Portland Trail Blazers guard Damian Lillard as the first guest.  Redick's The Old Man and the Three has over 220 million views on YouTube and 4.8 stars on Apple Podcasts.

Broadcasting 
Following his retirement, Redick became an on-air sports analyst for ESPN. Redick made his debut on November 3 as a studio analyst for coverage of the Brooklyn Nets-Atlanta Hawks game.

National team career
Redick was a member of the 2003 USA Men's Junior World Championship Team. In 2005, he competed with the USA Basketball Under-21 Team, in Frisco, Texas, which won gold medals at the World Championships and the Global Games. In 2006, Redick was named to the USA national team 2006–2008 National Team Program. He competed for a spot with the 2008 Olympic Team, but was not placed on the final roster. A recurring back injury kept him from competing in the 2007 FIBA Americas Championship.

Awards and honors
 2x Consensus National college player of the year (2005, 2006)
 2× Consensus National first-team All-American (2005, 2006)
 Consensus National third-team All-American (2004)
 Associated Press First Team All-American:: 2005, 2006
 Associated Press Player of the Year: 2006
 The Sporting News National Player of the Year: 2005, 2006
 United States Basketball Writers Association's Oscar Robertson Trophy College Basketball Co-Player of the Year: 2005, 2006
 Naismith College Player of the Year National Player of the Year: 2005, 2006
 John R. Wooden Player of the Year Award: 2005, 2006
 John R. Wooden All-American Team: 2006
 United States Basketball Writers Association(USBWA): 2005, 2006
 NABC Player of the Year: 2005, 2006
 2x ACC Tournament MVP (2005, 2006)
 Ten-time ACC Player of the Week 
 Lowe's Senior CLASS Award (2006)
 National Association of Basketball Coaches Co-Player of the Year: 2006)
 James E. Sullivan Award (2005)
 Anthony J. McKelvin Award (ACC Athlete of the Year for all sports): (2006)
 2× Adolph Rupp Trophy (2005-2006)
 2× ACC Player of the Year (2005, 2006)
 2× First-team All-ACC (2005, 2006)
 2× ACC tournament MVP (2005, 2006)
 2x ACC Player of the Year (2005, 2006)
 Adolph Rupp Trophy (2004-2005)
 Third-team All-American (2004)
 Second-team All-ACC (2004)
 3x All-ACC (2003, 2003, 2004)
 3x All-ACC tournament (2003, 2005, 2006)
 ACC All Freshman (2002, 2003)
 Second-team Parade All-American (2002))
 Virginia Mr. Basketball (2002)
 Virginia's all-time AAA leading scorer with 2,215 career points and shot more than 44 percent from 3-point arc during his career.
 Was named the 2002 A.P. Virginia Player of the Year 
 Three-time Gatorade Virginia Player of the Year 
 2002 Virginia Mr. Basketball 
 Parade Magazine All-America second team and USA Today All-USA second team.
 Won the 2002 McDonald's 3-point shooting competition.
 Played on two AAU teams (Hampton's Boo Williams All-Stars) that won national championships.
 No. 4 retired by Duke Blue Devils (2007)
 Won Virginia AAA state title championship at Cave Spring High (2002)
 McDonald's All-American Game MVP (2002)
 2x AAU first team All-American (2002)
 Inducted in VHSL hall of fame (2021)

Career statistics

NBA

Regular season

|-
| style="text-align:left;"|
| style="text-align:left;"|Orlando
| 42 || 0 || 14.8 || .410 || .388 || .900 || 1.2 || .9 || .3 || .0 || 6.0
|-
| style="text-align:left;"|
| style="text-align:left;"|Orlando
| 34 || 0 || 8.1 || .444 || .395 || .794 || .7 || .5 || .1 || .0 || 4.1
|-
| style="text-align:left;"|
| style="text-align:left;"|Orlando
| 64 || 5 || 17.4 || .391 || .374 || .871 || 1.7 || 1.1 || .3 || .0 || 6.0
|-
| style="text-align:left;"|
| style="text-align:left;"|Orlando
| style="background:#cfecec;"|  82* || 9 || 22.0 || .439 || .405 || .860 || 1.9 || 1.9|| .3 || .0 || 9.6
|-
| style="text-align:left;"|
| style="text-align:left;"|Orlando
| 59 || 5 || 25.4 || .441 || .397 || .875 || 1.9 || 1.7 || .5 || .1 || 10.1
|-
| style="text-align:left;"|
| style="text-align:left;"|Orlando
| 65 || 22 || 27.2 || .425 || .418 || .911 || 2.3 || 2.5 || .4 || .1 || 11.6
|-
| style="text-align:left;"|
| style="text-align:left;"|Orlando
| 50 || 11 || 31.5 || .450 || .390 || .891 || 2.4 || 4.4 || .6 || .1 || 15.1
|-
| style="text-align:left;"|
| style="text-align:left;"|Milwaukee
| 28 || 2 || 28.7 || .403 || .318 || .918 || 1.9 || 2.7 || .3 || .1 || 12.3
|-
| style="text-align:left;"|
| style="text-align:left;"|L.A. Clippers
| 35 || 34 || 28.2 || .455 || .395 || .915 || 2.1 || 2.2 || .8 || .1 || 15.2
|-
| style="text-align:left;"|
| style="text-align:left;"|L.A. Clippers
| 78 || 78 || 30.9 || .477 || .437 || .901 || 2.1 || 1.8 || .5 || .1 || 16.4
|-
| style="text-align:left;"|
| style="text-align:left;"|L.A. Clippers
| 75 || 75 || 28.0 || .480 || style="background:#cfecec;"|.475* || .888 || 1.9 || 1.4 || .6 || .1 || 16.3
|-
| style="text-align:left;"|
| style="text-align:left;"|L.A. Clippers
| 78 || 78 || 28.2 || .445 || .429 || .891 || 2.2 || 1.4 || .7 || .2 || 15.0
|-
| style="text-align:left;"|
| style="text-align:left;"|Philadelphia
| 70 || 70 || 30.2 || .460 || .420 || .904 || 2.5 || 3.0 || .5 || .1 || 17.1
|-
| style="text-align:left;"|
| style="text-align:left;"|Philadelphia
| 76 || 63 || 31.3 || .440 || .397 || .894 || 2.4 || 2.7 || .4 || .2 || 18.1
|-
| style="text-align:left;"|
| style="text-align:left;"|New Orleans
| 60 || 36 || 26.3 || .453 || .453 || .892 || 2.5 || 2.0 || .3 || .2 || 15.3
|-
| style="text-align:left;"|
| style="text-align:left;"|New Orleans
| 31 || 0 || 18.6 || .407 || .364 || .957 || 1.7 || 1.3 || .3 || .1 || 8.7
|-
| style="text-align:left;"|
| style="text-align:left;"|Dallas
| 13 || 0 || 11.3 || .358 || .395 || .800 || .9 || .8 || .2 || .1 || 4.4
|- class="sortbottom"
| style="text-align:center;" colspan="2"|Career
| 940 || 488 || 25.5 || .447 || .415 || .892 || 2.0 || 2.0 || .4 || .1 || 12.8

Playoffs

|-
| style="text-align:left;"|2007
| style="text-align:left;"|Orlando
| 1 || 0 || 11.0 || .500 || 1.000 ||  || .0 || 2.0 || .0 || .0 || 3.0
|-
| style="text-align:left;"|2008
| style="text-align:left;"|Orlando
| 2 || 0 || 5.0 || .000 || .000 ||  || .5 || .0 || .0 || .0 || .0
|-
| style="text-align:left;"|2009
| style="text-align:left;"|Orlando
| 16 || 8 || 20.4 || .373 || .404 || .929 || 1.2 || 1.9 || .5 || .1 || 6.0
|-
| style="text-align:left;"|2010
| style="text-align:left;"|Orlando
| 14 || 0 || 19.2 || .423 || .429 || .857 || 1.7 || 1.4 || .7 || .0 || 7.5
|-
| style="text-align:left;"|2011
| style="text-align:left;"|Orlando
| 6 || 0 || 20.0 || .357 || .067 || .750 || 1.8 || 1.0 || .2 || .2 || 6.7
|-
| style="text-align:left;"|2012
| style="text-align:left;"|Orlando
| 5 || 0 || 24.6 || .432 || .211 || .857 || 1.0 || 3.2 || .2 || .0 || 10.8
|-
| style="text-align:left;"|2013
| style="text-align:left;"|Milwaukee
| 4 || 0 || 17.3 || .440 || .333 || 1.000 || .8 || 1.3 || .3 || .0 || 7.3
|-
| style="text-align:left;"|2014
| style="text-align:left;"|L.A. Clippers
| 13 || 13 || 27.0 || .459 || .400 || .962 || 1.7 || 1.5 || .8 || .0 || 13.3
|-
| style="text-align:left;"|2015
| style="text-align:left;"|L.A. Clippers
| 14 || 14 || 38.6 || .435 || .398 || .943 || 2.1 || 1.7 || .7 || .4 || 14.9
|-
| style="text-align:left;"|2016
| style="text-align:left;"|L.A. Clippers
| 6 || 6 || 27.7 || .430 || .355 || .667 || 2.0 || .8 || .2 || .2 || 13.5
|-
| style="text-align:left;"|2017
| style="text-align:left;"|L.A. Clippers
| 7 || 7 || 29.4 || .380 || .346 || .850 || 1.7 || .9 || .3 || .0 || 9.1
|-
| style="text-align:left;"|2018
| style="text-align:left;"|Philadelphia
| 10 || 10 || 34.2 || .444 || .347 || .857 || 1.5 || 2.6 || .8 || .1 || 18.2
|-
| style="text-align:left;"|2019
| style="text-align:left;"|Philadelphia
| 12 || 12 || 31.3 || .435 || .414 || .850 || 1.4 || 1.6 || .1 || .3 || 13.4
|- class="sortbottom"
| style="text-align:center;" colspan="2"|Career
| 110 || 70 || 26.5 || .425 || .371 || .879 || 1.6 || 1.6 || .5 || .1 || 10.9

College

|-
| style="text-align:left;"|2002–03
| style="text-align:left;"|Duke
| 33 || 30 || 30.7 || .413 || .399 || .919 || 2.5 || 2.0 || 1.2 || .1 || 15.0
|-
| style="text-align:left;"|2003–04
| style="text-align:left;"|Duke
| 37 || 35 || 31.1 || .423 || .395 || .953 || 3.1 || 1.6 || .7 || .1 || 15.9
|-
| style="text-align:left;"|2004–05
| style="text-align:left;"|Duke
| 33 || 33 || 37.3 || .408 || .403 || .938 || 3.3 || 2.6 || 1.1 || .1 || 21.8
|-
| style="text-align:left;"|2005–06
| style="text-align:left;"|Duke
| 36 || 36 || 37.1 || .470 || .421 || .863 || 2.0 || 2.6 || 1.4 || .1 || 26.8
|- class="sortbottom"
| style="text-align:center;" colspan="2"|Career
| 139 || 134 || 34.0 || .433 || .406 || .912 || 2.7 || 2.2 || 1.1 || .1 || 19.9

Personal life
Redick was born in Cookeville, Tennessee, the son of Jeanie and Ken Redick. His father played basketball for two seasons at Ohio Wesleyan University, and his older twin sisters, Catie and Alyssa, both played for Campbell University. His younger brother, David, was a tight end for the Marshall University's football team until he decided not to play due to injury. He then moved to Orlando with JJ before going back home and attending Virginia Tech. His youngest sister, Abigail, played basketball for Virginia Tech and Drexel University. Redick was nicknamed "JJ" as a toddler because his twin sisters repeated his original nickname of "J". His father's background as a stoneware potter led to his middle name, "Clay." Redick graduated from Duke University with a major in history and a minor in cultural anthropology.

Redick is a Christian. Redick has four tattoos of Bible verses: Isaiah 40:31, Joshua 1:9, Psalm 40:1–3, and Philippians 4:13.

On June 13, 2006, Redick was arrested and charged with driving under the influence of alcohol in Durham County, North Carolina. His blood-alcohol level was 0.11, while the legal limit in North Carolina is 0.08. Redick was released on a $1,000 bond shortly after being arrested. Redick pleaded guilty.

On June 26, 2010, Redick married longtime girlfriend Chelsea Kilgore. They have two children together, Knox and Kai.

See also

 List of National Basketball Association annual statistical leaders
 List of National Basketball Association career 3-point scoring leaders
 List of National Basketball Association annual three-point field goal percentage leaders
 List of NCAA Division I men's basketball career scoring leaders
 List of NCAA Division I men's basketball career 3-point scoring leaders
 List of current National Basketball Association broadcasters

Notes

References

External links

Duke Blue Devils bio
USA Basketball bio
The JJ Redick Podcast

1984 births
Living people
All-American college men's basketball players
American men's basketball players
American podcasters
Basketball players from Tennessee
Basketball players from Virginia
Dallas Mavericks players
Duke Blue Devils men's basketball players
James E. Sullivan Award recipients
Los Angeles Clippers players
McDonald's High School All-Americans
Milwaukee Bucks players
New Orleans Pelicans players
Orlando Magic draft picks
Orlando Magic players
Parade High School All-Americans (boys' basketball)
People from Cookeville, Tennessee
Philadelphia 76ers players
Shooting guards
Sportspeople from Roanoke, Virginia